Tanner Ackley Anderson (born May 27, 1993) is an American professional baseball pitcher for the Fubon Guardians of the Chinese Professional Baseball League (CPBL). He previously played in Major League Baseball (MLB) for the Pittsburgh Pirates and Oakland Athletics.

Early life and amateur career
Tyler Anderson's parents are Lee and Lisa Anderson. As a child, he played the violin. After graduating from Plant High School in Tampa, Florida, Anderson enrolled at Harvard University where he played college baseball for the Harvard Crimson. As a senior at Harvard he pitched to a 0–4 record with a 4.08 ERA in 13 games (six starts). He studied biomedical engineering before switching majors to history of science.

Professional career

Pittsburgh Pirates
After his senior year, he was drafted by the Pittsburgh Pirates in the 20th round of the 2015 MLB draft, and he signed.

After signing, Anderson was assigned to the Bristol Pirates where he was 4–0 with a 2.38 ERA in 12 relief appearances. At the end of the season, he was promoted and pitched six relief innings for the West Virginia Black Bears in which he was 1–0 with a 4.50 ERA. In 2016, he pitched for the West Virginia Power and the Bradenton Marauders where he posted a combined 3–3 record and 3.58 ERA in 36 games pitched between both clubs. Anderson moved into the starting rotation for the Altoona Curve in 2017, going 10–8 with a 3.38 ERA in 30 games (19 starts). He began 2018 with the Indianapolis Indians.

Anderson was called up to the major leagues by the Pirates on June 27, 2018. In 24 relief appearances for Indianapolis prior to his promotion he was 1–1 with a 2.34 ERA.

Oakland Athletics
On November 20, 2018, Anderson was traded to the Oakland Athletics in exchange for a player to be named later, pitcher Wilkin Ramos. Anderson spent the majority of the 2019 season with the Triple-A Las Vegas Aviators. On September 1, 2019, Anderson was designated for assignment after recording an 0–3 record and 6.04 ERA in 5 major league games.

Sioux Falls Canaries
On August 26, 2020, Anderson signed with the Sioux Falls Canaries of the American Association. Anderson recorded a 1–2 record and 10.64 ERA in 4 appearances with the Canaries.

Oakland Athletics (second stint)
After the conclusion of the season on September 18, 2020, Anderson was returned to the Athletics organization. He began the 2021 season with Triple-A Las Vegas, pitching to a 3–0 record and 3.60 ERA in 12 appearances before being released on June 17, 2021.

Pittsburgh Pirates (second stint)
On July 5, 2021, Anderson signed a minor league contract with the Pittsburgh Pirates organization. On September 30, Anderson was selected to the 40-man roster. Anderson made a single appearance for the Pirates, yielding two earned runs in five innings, and recording one strikeout. Anderson was released following the season on November 16.

Toros de Tijuana
On February 23, 2022, Anderson signed with the Toros de Tijuana of the Mexican League. In 9 starts, he posted a 2–5 record with a 3.78 ERA and 25 strikeouts in 47.2 innings. Anderson was waived on June 20, 2022.

Bravos de León
On June 21, 2022, Anderson was claimed off waivers by the Bravos de León of the Mexican League.

Fubon Guardians
On June 28, 2022, Anderson had his contract purchased by the Fubon Guardians of the Chinese Professional Baseball League.

References

External links

Harvard Crimson bio

1993 births
Living people
Sportspeople from Boynton Beach, Florida
Baseball players from Florida
Major League Baseball pitchers
Pittsburgh Pirates players
Oakland Athletics players
Harvard Crimson baseball players
Bristol Pirates players
West Virginia Black Bears players
West Virginia Power players
Bradenton Marauders players
Surprise Saguaros players
Altoona Curve players
Indianapolis Indians players
Las Vegas Aviators players
American expatriate baseball players in Mexico
American expatriate baseball players in Taiwan
Toros de Tijuana players
Mat-Su Miners players
Fubon Guardians players